The Frederick C. Malkus Bridge, also known as the Choptank River Bridge, is a four-lane none-span beam bridge across the Choptank River in Maryland. Built in 1987 to replace the aging Emerson C. Harrington Bridge, the new bridge was named after Maryland state senator Frederick Malkus. U.S. Route 50 (US 50) crosses the river over the bridge between the towns of Cambridge and Trappe. The bridge is made of pre-stressed and pre-cast concrete.

References 

1987 establishments in Maryland
Bridges completed in 1987
Bridges of the United States Numbered Highway System
Road bridges in Maryland
U.S. Route 50